In fluid dynamics, Faxén's laws relate a sphere's velocity  and angular velocity  to the forces, torque, stresslet and flow it experiences under low Reynolds number (creeping flow) conditions.

First law
Faxen's first law was introduced in 1922 by Swedish physicist Hilding Faxén, who at the time was active at Uppsala University, and is given by

where
  is the force exerted by the fluid on the sphere
  is the Newtonian viscosity of the solvent in which the sphere is placed
  is the sphere's radius
  is the (translational) velocity of the sphere
  is the disturbance velocity caused by the other spheres in suspension (not by the background impressed flow), evaluated at the sphere centre
  is the background impressed flow, evaluated at the sphere centre (set to zero in some references).

It can also be written in the form

where  is the hydrodynamic mobility.

In the case that the pressure gradient is small compared with the length scale of the sphere's diameter, and when there is no external force, the last two terms of this form may be neglected.  In this case the external fluid flow simply advects the sphere.

Second law
Faxen's second law is given by

where
 is the torque exerted by the fluid on the sphere
 is the angular velocity of the sphere
 is the angular velocity of the background flow, evaluated at the sphere centre (set to zero in some references).

'Third law'
Batchelor and Green derived an equation for the stresslet, given by

where
 is the stresslet (symmetric part of the first moment of force) exerted by the fluid on the sphere,
 is the velocity gradient tensor;  represents transpose; and so  is the rate of strain, or deformation, tensor.
 is the rate of strain of the background flow, evaluated at the sphere centre (set to zero in some references).

Note there is no rate of strain on the sphere (no ) since the spheres are assumed to be rigid.

Faxén's law is a correction to Stokes' law for the friction on spherical objects in a viscous fluid, valid where the object moves close to a wall of the container.

See also 
 Immersed boundary method

Notes

References 

Equations of fluid dynamics